Anthidium peruvianum is a species of bee in the family Megachilidae, the leaf-cutter, carder, or mason bees.

Distribution
Chile
Peru

References

peruvianum
Insects described in 1910